A gubernatorial election was held on 15 February 2017 to elect the governor of Banten province for the five-year term between 2017 and 2022. The election was held simultaneously with other provincial and local elections across the country as part of the 2017 local elections. It pitted incumbent Rano Karno against People's Representative Council member and former mayor of Tangerang Wahidin Halim.

Wahidin, supported by a coalition of 6 parliamentary parties, secured a landslide victory in his former constituency at Tangerang, and defeated Rano with a margin of 90,000 votes despite losing in 6 of the other 7 regencies and cities.

Background
Ratu Atut Chosiyah served as the governor of Banten - Indonesia's fifth most populous province - between 2007 and 2014, until she was arrested for a bribery scandal related to an election dispute. Some has described her family's influence in the province as a "political dynasty". 2017 marked the second time Indonesia held local elections simultaneously, after the 2015 local elections.

After some time being acting governor, former actor Rano Karno who was also Atut's deputy was sworn in the governor to replace her in August 2015. The General Election Supervisory Agency (Bawaslu) identified Banten as a vulnerable region for the 2017 election, alongside Aceh and West Papua. In particular, the body cited the strong presence of political dynasties.

Timeline
Registration for the candidates opened between 28 and 30 August 2016, with the campaign period ranging from October 2016 to February 2017. The voting itself took place on 15 February 2017. The results were planned to be released in March 2017.

Candidates

Opinion surveys

Issues
Affiliation with Atut's dynasty became a major issue in the campaign. Both candidates accused each other of being affiliated with her dynasty: Rano-Embay because Rano was Atut's deputy, Wahidin-Andika because Andika is Ratu Atut's son. Atut herself voiced support for her son.

Results

On 5 April, KPU officially announced Wahidin-Andika as the winning pair.

Aftermath
Following the defeat, PDI-P leader Megawati Soekarnoputri removed the party's leaders in Banten. Rano brought the election to the Constitutional Court, which rejected his lawsuit (citing that the difference in votes was too large) and declared the election valid. On 12 May 2017, Wahidin was sworn in as the new governor.

References

Elections in Banten
2017 Indonesian gubernatorial elections